Ronald Radd (22 January 1929 – 23 April 1976) was a British television actor. He is perhaps best remembered for originating the role of Hunter in the television thriller series Callan. In 1971, he was nominated for a Tony Award for Abelard and Heloise.

Early work
Radd began as a stage actor in the Alexandra Theatre in Birmingham in the early-1950s, along with the likes of Leslie Sands and Edward Mulhare. In 1951 he appeared in a Lionel Hamilton production of The Romantic Young Lady at the Kettering Savoy.

By 1954, Radd had graduated to the West End, where he appeared with Kenneth Williams in two different productions in the Apollo Theatre in February 1956, The Buccaneer and The Boy Friend.

Television and film work
Radd gradually lost interest in theatre and broke into television in Ordeal by Fire in 1957 as a dastardly Frenchman with Peter Wyngarde and Patrick Troughton whom he appeared with in the BBC production of A Tale of Two Cities (1958).

Radd made a number of appearances in the NBC production The Shari Lewis Show between 1960 and 1963, and in 1960 appeared in the production of Eugene O'Neill's The Iceman Cometh directed by Sidney Lumet, who also directed him in the feature film adaptation of The Sea Gull (1968) and The Offence (1972). In between them he appeared in John Huston's The Kremlin Letter (1970). Radd worked alongside actors such as Robert Redford and Jason Robards. In that year, Radd also appeared in the NBC production of The Tempest playing the role of the drunkard Stefano, alongside Richard Burton who portrayed Caliban and Maurice Evans as Prospero.  Radd had at least one guest appearance on Episode 2 of the TV series The Saint, which starred a young Roger Moore.  The episode first aired Sept 26, 1963.

Radd featured in some 60 different TV shows between 1955 and 1976 including The Avengers, Danger Man, The Prisoner, Special Branch and Z-Cars. He memorably played "Hunter" in the one-off television play in ITV's "Armchair Theatre" strand, called A Magnum For Schneider.  To protect his shady Government department ("The Section"), Hunter brings once-top operative and assassin David Callan (Edward Woodward) back to kill Schneider, an international illegal arms dealer.  Hunter's plan is for Callan to be caught at the scene and take the blame, thus getting the job done yet clearing The Section of involvement. But Callan gets wise when first police, then colleague Toby Meres turn up at Schneider's apartment. Callan turns the tables by leaving Meres unconscious in his place. This led to the creation of the highly regarded spy series Callan with highly charged, antagonistic exchanges between Callan and Hunter among episode highlights.  Radd appeared occasionally in later series of Callan.

In the sixth episode of Randall and Hopkirk (Deceased), "Just for the Record" in 1969, he played the role of the villain Pargiter, a deluded character intent on proving he was heir to the throne of England.

In 1971, Radd's performance in Abelard and Heloise, earned him a nomination for Broadway's Tony Award for Best Featured Actor in a Play.

Death
He died in Toronto, Ontario, Canada of a brain haemorrhage in 1976 aged 47.

Selected filmography
 The Camp on Blood Island (1958) – Commander Yamamitsu
 The Iceman Cometh (1960) – Captain Cecil Lewis
 The Small World of Sammy Lee (1963) – Big Alf
 Up Jumped a Swagman (1965) – Harry King
 Where the Spies Are (1966) – Stanilaus
 Mister Ten Per Cent (1967) – Publicist
 The Double Man (1967) – Russian General
 The Sea Gull (1968) – Shamraev
 Can Heironymus Merkin Ever Forget Mercy Humppe and Find True Happiness? (1969) – Critic Bentley
 The Kremlin Letter (1970) – Captain Potkin
 The Offence (1972) – Lawson
 Divorce His, Divorce Hers (1973) – Angus McIntyre
 Galileo (1975) – Vanni
 The Spiral Staircase (1975) – Oates
 Operation Daybreak (1975) – Aunt Marie's Husband

References

External links
 

1929 births
1976 deaths
English male film actors
English male television actors
People from Sunderland
Male actors from Tyne and Wear
20th-century English male actors
English male stage actors